Burton is a former civil parish, now in the parish of Duddon and Burton, in Cheshire West and Chester, England.  It contains two buildings that are recorded in the National Heritage List for England as designated listed buildings.  These consist of a country house, and an associated wall and gateway.

Key

Buildings

References
Citations

Sources

Listed buildings in Cheshire West and Chester
Lists of listed buildings in Cheshire